

A

Aa – Ak 

 

 

Abellaite (IMA2014-111) 5.BE.  [no] [no] (IUPAC: sodium dilead hydro dicarbonate)
Abelsonite (IMA1975-013) 10.CA.20    (IUPAC: a nickel porphyrine derivative)
Abenakiite-(Ce) (IMA1991-054) 9.CK.10   [no]
Abernathyite (natroautunite: 1956) 8.EB.15   
Abhurite (IMA1983-061) 3.DA.30   
Abramovite (IMA2006-016) 2.HF.25a    (IUPAC: dilead tin indium heptasulfa bismuthide)
Abswurmbachite (braunite: IMA1990-007) 9.AG.05    (IUPAC: copper(II) hexamanganese(III) octaoxo tetraoxosilicate)
Abuite (IMA2014-084) 8.B0.  [no] [no] (IUPAC: calcium dialuminium difluoro diphosphate)
Acanthite (acanthite: 1855) 2.BA.35    (IUPAC: disilver sulfide)
Acetamide (IMA1974-039) 10.AA.20    (IUPAC: acetic acid amide)
Achalaite (wodginite: IMA2013-103) 4.D0.  [no] [no] (IUPAC: iron(II) titanium diniobium octaoxide)
Achávalite (nickeline: 1939) 2.CC.05   [no] (IUPAC: iron selenide)
Achyrophanite (IMA2018-011) 8.0  [no] [no]
Acmonidesite (IMA2013-068) 7.AC.  [no] [no]
ActinoliteI [Ca-amphibole: IMA2012 s.p., actynolite (1794)] 9.DE.10   
Acuminite (tikhonenkovite: IMA1986-038) 3.CC.10    (IUPAC: strontium hydro tetrafluoroaluminate monohydrate)
Adachiite (tourmaline: IMA2012-101) 9.CK.  [no] 
Adamite (andalusite: 1866) 8.BB.30    (IUPAC: dizinc hydro arsenate)
Adamsite-(Y) (IMA1999-020) 5.CC.30    (IUPAC: sodium yttrium dicarbonate hexahydrate)
Adanite (IMA2019-088) 7.0  [no] [no] (IUPAC: dilead tellurite sulfate)
Addibischoffite (sapphirine: IMA2015-006) 4.BC.  [no] [no]
Adelite (Y: 1891) 8.BH.35    (IUPAC: calcium magnesium hydro arsenate)
Admontite (IMA1978-012) 6.FA.15    (IUPAC: magnesio decaoxo hexaborate heptahydrate)
Adolfpateraite (IMA2011-042) 7.EC.  [no]  (IUPAC: potassium uranyl hydro sulfate water)
Adranosite 7.BC.
Adranosite (IMA2008-057) 7.BC.   
Adranosite-(Fe) (IMA2011-006) 7.BC.  [no] 
Adrianite (IMA2014-028) 9.AD.  [no] [no]
Aegirine (pyroxene: IMA1998 s.p., 1835) 9.DA.25    (IUPAC: sodium iron(III) hexaoxy disilicate)
Aegirine-augiteI (pyroxene: IMA1988 s.p., 1988 Rd) 9.DA.20  [no] [no]
Aenigmatite (sapphirine: IMA1967 s.p., 1865) 9.DH.40   
Aerinite (IMA1988 s.p., 1876 Rd) 9.DB.45   
Aerugite (IMA1965 s.p., 1858 Rd) 8.BC.15   

Aeschynite 04.DF.05
Aeschynite-(Ce) (IMA1987 s.p., 1830) 4.DF.05   
Aeschynite-(Nd) (IMA1987 s.p., 1982) 4.DF.05   
Aeschynite-(Y) (IMA1987 s.p., 1906) 4.DF.05   
Afghanite (cancrinite-sodalite: IMA1967-041) 9.FB.05   
Afmite (IMA2005-025a) 8.DD.15  [no] 
Afwillite (spurrite-afwillite: 1925) 9.AG.75    (IUPAC: tricalcium tetraoxysilicate dihydroxosilicate dihydrate)
Agaite (tellurium oxysalt: IMA2011-115) 7.D?.  [no] [no] (IUPAC: trilead copper(II) tellurium(VI) dihydro pentaoxide carbonate)
Agakhanovite-(Y) (milarite: IMA2013-090) 9.CM.  [no] [no]
Agardite 08.DL.15 (IUPAC: REE hexacopper(II) hexahydro triarsenate trihydrate)
Agardite-(Ce) (mixite: IMA2003-030) 8.DL.15   [no]
Agardite-(La) (mixite: IMA1980-092) 8.DL.15   
Agardite-(Nd) (mixite: IMA2010-056) 8.DL.15   
Agardite-(Y) (mixite: IMA1968-021) 8.DL.15   
Agmantinite (wurtzite: IMA2014-083) 2.CB.  [no] [no] (IUPAC: disilver manganese tetrasulfa stannide)
Agrellite (IMA1973-032) 9.DH.75    (IUPAC: sodium dicalcium fluoro decaoxo tetrasilicate)
Agricolaite (IMA2009-081) 5.ED.50  [no] [no] (IUPAC: tetrapotassium uranyl tricarbonate)
Agrinierite (compreignacite: IMA1971-046) 4.GB.05   
Aguilarite (acanthite: 1891) 2.BA.55    (IUPAC: tetrasilver selenide sulfide)
Monoclinic ‘acanthite-like’ series (from Ag2S-Ag2S0.4Se0.6)
Orthorhombic ‘naumannite-like’ series (from Ag2S0.3Se0.7-Ag2Se)
Aheylite (turquoise: IMA1984-036) 8.DD.15   
Ahlfeldite (cobaltomenite: 1935) 4.JH.10    (IUPAC: nickel selenite(IV) dihydrate)
Ahrensite (spinel, ringwoodite: IMA2013-028) 9.AC.  [no] [no] (SiFe2O4)
Aikinite (meneghinite: 1843) 2.HB.05a    (IUPAC: copper lead trisulfa bismuthide)
Aiolosite (apatite: IMA2008-015) 7.BD.20   [no]
Airdite (IMA020-046) 8.CJ.  [no] [no]
Ajoite (ajoite: 1958) 9.EA.70   
Akaganéite (hollandite, coronadite: IMA1962-004) 4.DK.05   
Akaogiite (baddeleyite: IMA2007-058) 4.D0.  [no] [no] (IUPAC: titanium dioxide)
Akatoreite (IMA1969-015) 9.BH.15   
Akdalaite (nolanite: IMA1969-002) 4.FL.70   
Åkermanite (melilite: 1884) 9.BB.10    (IUPAC: dicalcium magnesium heptaoxo disilicate)
Akhtenskite (ramsdellite: IMA1982-072) 4.DB.15b    (IUPAC: manganese dioxide)
Akimotoite (corundum: IMA1997-044) 4.CB.05   [no] (IUPAC: magnesium trioxo silicate)
Aklimaite (IMA2011-050) 9.0  [no]  (IUPAC: tetracalcium [pentaoxodisilicate dihydroxyl] tetrahydroxyl pentahydrate)
Akopovaite (hydrotalcite: IMA2018-095) 5.0  [no] [no]
Akrochordite (Y: 1922) 8.DD.10    (IUPAC: pentamanganese(II) tetrahydro diarsenate tetrahydrate)
Aksaite (IMA1967 s.p., 1962) 6.FA.05    (IUPAC: magnesium hexahydro heptaoxo hexaborate dihydrate)
Aktashite (nowackiite: IMA2008 s.p., 1968) 2.GA.30

Al – An 
Alabandite (galena, rocksalt: 1822) 2.CD.10    (IUPAC: manganese(II) sulfide)
Alacránite (IMA1985-033) 2.FA.20    (IUPAC: octarsenic nonasulfide)
Alamosite (Y: 1909) 9.DO.20    (IUPAC: lead trioxysilicate)
Alarsite (quartz: IMA1993-003) 8.AA.05    (IUPAC: aluminium arsenate)
Albertiniite (IMA2015-004) 4.JE.  [no] [no] (IUPAC: iron(II) sulfite trihydrate)
Albite (feldspar: 1815) 9.FA.35    (IUPAC: sodium (octaoxy alumotrisilicate))
Albrechtschraufite (IMA1983-078) 5.ED.15   
Alburnite (argyrodite: IMA2012-073) 2.BA.  [no] [no] (IUPAC: octasilver germanium ditelluride tetrasulfide) 
Alcantarillaite (IMA2019-072) 8.0  [no] [no]
Alcaparrosaite (alcaparrosaite: IMA2011-024) 7.DF.  [no] 
Aldermanite (IMA1980-044) 8.DE.35    (Mg5Al12(PO4)8(OH)22·32H2O)
Aldomarinoite (brackebuschite: IMA2021-054) 8.BG.  [no] [no]
Aldridgeite (devilline: IMA2010-029) 7.DF.  [no] [no]
Aleksandrovite (baratovite: IMA2009-004) 9.CJ.25  [no]  (KCa7Sn2Li3Si12O36F2)
Aleksite (tetradymite: IMA1977-038) 2.GC.40a    (IUPAC: lead dibismuth ditelluride disulfide)
Aleutite (IMA2018-014) 8.0  [no] [no]
Alexkhomyakovite (IMA2015-013) 05.DA.  [no] [no] (IUPAC: hexapotassium (dicalcium sodium) chloro pentacarbonate hexahydrate)
Alexkuznetsovite 9.B
Alexkuznetsovite-(Ce) (biraite: IMA2019-118) 9.B  [no] [no]
Alexkuznetsovite-(La) (biraite: IMA2019-081) 9.B  [no] [no]
Alflarsenite (zeolitic tectosilicate: IMA2008-023) 9.G?.   
Alforsite (apatite: IMA1980-039) 8.BN.05    (IUPAC: pentabarium chloro triphosphate)
Alfredopetrovite (IMA2015-026) 7.CA.  [no] [no] (IUPAC: dialuminium triselenite(IV) hexahydrate)
Alfredstelznerite (IMA2007-050) 6.D0.   
Algodonite (metalloid alloy: 1857) 2.AA.10a   
Alicewilsonite (mckelveyite) 5.CC.
Alicewilsonite-(YCe) (mckelveyite: IMA2020-055) 5.CC.  [no] [no]
Alicewilsonite-(YLa) (mckelveyite: IMA2021-047) 5.CC. [no] [no] [no]
Aliettite (corrensite: 1969) 9.EC.60   
Allabogdanite (barringerite: IMA2000-038) 1.BD.15   [no] (IUPAC: di(iron,nickel) phosphide)
Allactite (allactite: IMA1980 s.p., 1884) 8.BE.30    (IUPAC: heptamanganese(II) octahydro diarsenate)
Allanite 9.BG.05b
Allanite-(Ce) (epidote, allanite: IMA1987 s.p., 1812) 9.BG.05b   
Allanite-(La) (epidote, allanite: IMA2003-065) 9.BG.05b   
Allanite-(Nb) (epidote, allanite: IMA2010-060) 9.BG.05b  [no] [no]
Allanite-(Y) (epidote, allanite: IMA1966 s.p., 1949) 9.BG.05b   [no]
Allanpringite (wavellite: IMA2004-050) 8.DC.50   [no] (IUPAC: triiron(III) trihydro diphosphate pentahydrate)
Allargentum (allargentum: IMA1970 s.p., 1950 Rd) 2.AA.30   
Alleghanyite (humite: 1932) 9.AF.45    (IUPAC: pentamanganese(II) di(tetraoxysilicate) dihydroxyl)
Allendeite (IMA2007-027) 4.CC.   [no] (IUPAC: tetrascandium trizirconium dodecaoxide)
Allochalcoselite (IMA2004-025) 4.JG.40    (IUPAC: copper(I) pentacopper(II) lead pentachloro dioxodiselenite)
Alloclasite (lollingite: 1865) 2.EB.10b    (IUPAC: cobalt arsenide sulfide)
Allophane (allophane: 1816) 9.ED.20   
Alloriite (cancrinite: IMA2006-020) 9.FB.05   
Alluaivite (eudialyte: IMA1988-052) 9.CO.10   
Alluaudite (alluaudite: IMA1979 s.p., 1848 Rd) 8.AC.10   
Almandine (garnet, garnet: old/ 1546?) 9.AD.25   
Almarudite (milarite: IMA2002-048) 9.CM.05   [no]
Almeidaite (crichtonite: IMA2013-020) 4.C?.  [no] [no]
Alnaperbøeite-(Ce) (gatelite: IMA2012-054) 9.B?.  [no] [no]
Alpeite (ardennite: IMA2016-072) 9.B?.  [no] [no]
Alpersite (melanterite: IMA2003-040) 7.CB.35  [no] [no] (IUPAC: magnesium sulfate heptahydrate)
Alsakharovite-Zn (labuntsovite: IMA2002-003) 9.CE.30h   [no]
Alstonite (alstonite: 1841) 5.AB.35    (IUPAC: barium calcium dicarbonate)
Altaite (galena, rocksalt: 1845) 2.CD.10    (IUPAC: lead telluride)
Alterite (sulfate-oxalate: IMA2018-070) 10.0  [no] [no] (IUPAC: dizinc tetrairon(III) tetrahydro tetrasulfate dioxalate heptadecahydrate)
Althausite (IMA1974-050) 8.BB.25    (Mg4(PO4)2(OH,O)(F,☐)) 
Althupite (IMA1986-003) 8.EC.25   
Altisite (lemoynite: IMA1993-055) 9.DP.40   [no]
Alum (chemical compound)
Alum-(K) (IMA2007 s.p., 1951, 77 CE) 7.CC.20    (IUPAC: potassium aluminium disulfate dodecahydrate)
Alum-(Na) (IMA2007 s.p., 1951, 77 CE) 7.CC.20    (IUPAC: sodium aluminium disulfate dodecahydrate)
Aluminite (aluminite: old/ 1805) 7.DC.05    (IUPAC: dialuminium tetrahydro sulfate heptahydrate)
Aluminium (IMA1980-085a) 1.AA.05   
Aluminoceladonite (mica: IMA1998 s.p.) 9.EC.15   [no]
Aluminocerite-(Ce) (whitlockite: IMA2007-060) 9.AG.20   [no] 
Aluminocopiapite (copiapite: 1947) 7.DB.35   
Aluminocoquimbite (coquimbite: IMA2019-F, IMA2009-095) 7.CB.50  [no]  (IUPAC: aluminium iron trisulfate nonahydrate)
Aluminomagnesiohulsite (hulsite: IMA2002-038) 6.AB.45   [no] (IUPAC: dimagnesium aluminium dioxoborate)
Alumino-oxy-rossmanite (tourmaline: IMA2020-008b) 9.CK.  [no] [no]
Aluminopyracmonite (pyracmonite: IMA2012-075) 7.AC.  [no] [no] (IUPAC: triammonium aluminium trisulfate)
Aluminosugilite (milarite: IMA2018-142) 9.CM.  [no] [no]
Alumoåkermanite (melilite: IMA2008-049) 9.BB.10   
Alumoedtollite (edtollite: IMA2017-020) 8.AC.  [no] [no] (IUPAC: dipotassium sodium pentacopper aluminium dioxo tetrarsenate)
Alumohydrocalcite (alumohydrocalcite: IMA1980 s.p., 1926) 5.DB.05    (IUPAC: calcium dialuminium tetrahydro dicarbonate trihydrate)
Alumoklyuchevskite (klyuchevskite: IMA1993-004) 7.BC.45    (IUPAC: tripotassium tricopper(II) aluminium dioxo tetrasulfate)
Alumotantite (IMA1980-025) 4.DB.55    (IUPAC: aluminium tantalum tetraoxide)
Alumovesuvianite (vesuvianite: IMA2016-014) 9.BG.  [no] [no]
Alunite (alunite, alunite: IMA1987 s.p., 1565 Rd) 7.BC.10    (IUPAC: potassium trialuminium hexahydro disulfate)
Alunogen (Y: 1832) 7.CB.45    (Al2(SO4)3(H2O)12·5H2O)
Alvanite (chalcoalumite: IMA1962 s.p., 1959) 8.FE.05    (Zn2+Al4(V5+O3)2(OH)12·2H2O)
Alwilkinsite-(Y) (IMA2015-097) 7.EB.  [no] [no]
Amakinite (brucite: IMA1967 s.p., 1962) 4.FE.05    (IUPAC: iron(II) dihydroxide)
Amamoorite (ilvaite: IMA2018-105) 9.B?.  [no] [no] (IUPAC: calcium dimanganese(II) manganese(III) heptaoxodisilicate oxyhydroxyl)
Amarantite (amarantite: 1888) 7.DB.30    (IUPAC: diiron(III) oxodisulfate heptahydrate)
Amarillite (tamarugite: 1933) 7.CC.75    (IUPAC: sodium iron(III) disulfate hexahydrate)
Amblygonite (amblygonite, titanite: 1818) 8.BB.05    (IUPAC: lithium aluminium fluoro phosphate)
Ambrinoite (IMA2009-071) 2.HE.10  [no] [no]
Ameghinite (IMA1966-034) 6.CA.10    (IUPAC: sodium tetrahydro trioxotriborate)
Amesite (serpentine: 1876) 9.ED.15   
Amgaite (IMA2021-104) 7.AC.  [no] [no]
Amicite (zeolitic tectosilicate: IMA1979-011) 9.GC.05   
Aminoffite (Y: 1937) 9.BH.05   
Ammineite (IMA2008-032) 3.C0.  [no] [no] (IUPAC: copper dichloride · diammine)
Ammonioalunite (alunite, alunite: IMA1986-037) 7.BC.10    (IUPAC: ammonium trialuminium hexahydro disulfate)
Ammonioborite (Y: 1931) 6.EA.15   
Ammoniojarosite (alunite, alunite: IMA1987 s.p., 1927 Rd) 7.BC.10    (IUPAC: ammonium triiron(III) hexahydro disulfate)
Ammoniolasalite (lasalite: IMA2017-094) 4.HC.  [no] [no]
Ammonioleucite (zeolitic tectosilicate: IMA1984-015) 9.GB.05   
Ammoniomagnesiovoltaite (voltaite: IMA2009-040) 7.CC.25  [no] 
Ammoniomathesiusite (mathesiusite: IMA2017-077) 7.DF.  [no] [no]
Ammoniovoltaite (voltaite: IMA2017-022) 7.CC.  [no] [no]
Ammoniotinsleyite (leucophosphite: IMA2019-128) 8.0  [no] [no]
Ammoniozippeite (zippeite: IMA2017-073) 7.0  [no] [no]
Amstallite (IMA1986-030) 9.DP.25   
Analcime (zeolitic tectosilicate: IMA1997 s.p., 1797) 9.GB.05   
Anandite (mica: IMA1966-005) 9.EC.35   
Anapaite (Y: 1902) 8.CH.10    (IUPAC: dicalcium iron(II) diphosphate tetrahydrate)
Anatase (IMA1962 s.p., 1801) 4.DD.05    (IUPAC: titanium dioxide)
Anatolyite (yurmarinite: IMA2016-040) 8.0  [no] [no]
Ancylite 05.DC.05
Ancylite-(Ce) (IMA1987 s.p., 1901) 5.DC.05    (IUPAC: cerium strontium hydro dicarbonate monohydrate)
Ancylite-(La) (IMA1995-053) 5.DC.05    (IUPAC: lanthanum strontium hydro dicarbonate monohydrate)
Andalusite (andalusite: 1798) 9.AF.10   
Andersonite (Y: 1951) 5.ED.30   
Andorite 2.JB.40a (IUPAC: silver lead hexasulfa triantimonide)
Andradite (garnet, garnet: 1800) 9.AD.25   
Andreadiniite (lillianite: IMA2014-049) 2.0  [no] [no] (CuHgAg7Pb7Sb24S48)
Andrémeyerite (IMA1972-005) 9.BB.20    (IUPAC: barium diiron(II) heptaoxysilicate)
Andreyivanovite (phosphide: IMA2006-003) 1.BD.15   [no] (IUPAC: iron chromium phosphide)
Andrianovite (eudialyte: IMA2007-008) 9.CO.10  [no] [no]
Anduoite (Y: 1979) 2.EB.15a    (IUPAC: ruthenium diarsenide)
Andychristyite (tellurium oxysalt: IMA2015-024) 7.CC.  [no] [no] (PbCu2+Te6+O5(H2O))
Andymcdonaldite (tapiolite: IMA2018-141) 4.0  [no] [no] (IUPAC: diiron tellurium hexaoxide)
Andyrobertsite (andyrobertsite: IMA1997-023) 8.DH.50   (KCdCu5(AsO4)4[As(OH)2O2]·2H2O)
Angarfite (IMA2010-082) 8.AC.  [no]  (IUPAC: sodium pentairon(III) tetrahydro tetraphosphate tetrahydrate)
Angastonite (IMA2008-008) 8.DL.25   [no] (IUPAC: calcium magnesium dialuminium tetrahydro diphosphate heptahydrate)
Ángelaite (kobellite: IMA2003-064) 2.JB.25f   [no] (IUPAC: dicopper silver lead bismuth tetrasulfide)
Angelellite (IMA1962 s.p., 1959) 8.BC.05    (IUPAC: tetrairon(III) trioxodiarsenate)
Anglesite (baryte: 1832) 7.AD.35    (IUPAC: lead sulfate)
Anhydrite (Y: 1795) 7.AD.30    (IUPAC: anhydrous calcium sulfate)
AnhydrokainiteQ (chlorothionite: 1912) 7.BC.80  [no] [no] (IUPAC: potassium magnesium chloro sulfate)
Anilite (digenite: IMA1968-030) 2.BA.10    (IUPAC: heptacopper tetrasulfide)
Ankerite (dolomite: 1825) 5.AB.10    (IUPAC: calcium (iron(II),magnesium) dicarbonate)
Ankinovichite (chalcoalumite: IMA2002-063) 8.FE.05    (NiAl4(V5+O3)2(OH)12·2H2O)
Annabergite (vivianite: 1852) 8.CE.40    (IUPAC: trinickel diarsenate octahydrate)
Annite (mica: IMA1998 s.p., 1868) 9.EC.20    (IUPAC: potassium triiron(II) (decaoxyaluminotrisilicate) dihydroxyl)
Anorpiment (IMA2011-014) 2.FA.  [no]  (IUPAC: diarsenic trisulfide)
Anorthite (feldspar: 1823) 9.FA.35    (IUPAC: calcium (octaoxy dialumodisilicate))
AnorthoclaseI (Y: 1885) 9.FA.30   
Anorthominasragrite (minasragrite: IMA2001-040) 7.DB.20   [no] (IUPAC: vanadium(IV) oxosulfate pentahydrate)
Anorthoroselite (fairfieldite: 1955, Rn) 8.CG.10    (IUPAC: dicalcium cobalt diarsenate dihydrate)
Ansermetite (IMA2002-017) 4.HD.30   [no] (IUPAC: manganese(II) divanadium(V) hexaoxide tetrahydrate)
Antarcticite (IMA1965-015) 3.BB.30    (IUPAC: calcium dichloride hexahydrate)
Anthoinite (anthoinite: 1947) 7.GB.35   
Anthonyite (anthonyite: IMA1967 s.p., 1963) 3.DA.40    (IUPAC: copper(II) dihydroxide trihydrate)
Anthophyllite [Mg-Fe-Mn-amphibole: IMA2012 s.p., 1801] 9.DD.05   
Antigorite (serpentine: IMA1998 s.p., 1840 Rd) 9.ED.15   
Antimonselite (stibnite: IMA1992-003) 2.DB.05    (IUPAC: diantimony triselenide)
Antimony (arsenic: 1748) 1.CA.05   
Antipinite (IMA2014-027) 10.0  [no] [no] (IUPAC: potassium trisodium dicopper tetraoxalate)
Antlerite (IMA1968 s.p., 1889) 7.BB.15    (IUPAC: tricopper(II) tetrahydro sulfate)
Antofagastaite (syngenite: IMA2018-049) 7.0  [no] [no] (IUPAC: tetrasodium dicalcium tetrasulfate trihydrate)
Anyuiite (khatyrkite: IMA1987-053) 1.AA.15    (IUPAC: gold dilead alloy)
Anzaite-(Ce) (IMA2013-004) 4.CC.  [no] [no] (Ce4Fe2+Ti6O18(OH)2)

Ap – Az 
Apachite (IMA1979-022) 9.HE.10   (For the apatite series, see hydroxylapatite, fluorapatite, and chlorapatite)
Apexite (struvite: IMA2015-002) 8.CA.  [no] [no] (IUPAC: sodium magnesium phosphate nonahydrate)
Aphthitalite (aphthitalite: 1813) 7.AC.35    (IUPAC: tripotassium sodium disulfate)
Apjohnite (halotrichite: 1847) 7.CB.85    (Mn2+Al2(SO4)4·22H2O)
Aplowite (starkeyite: IMA1963-009) 7.CB.15    (IUPAC: cobalt(II) sulfate tetrahydrate)
Apuanite (trippkeite: IMA1978-069) 4.JA.25   
Aqualite (eudialyte: IMA2002-066) 9.CO.10   
Aradite (zadovite, arctite: IMA2013-047) 8.0  [no] [no] (BaCa6[(SiO4)(PO4)](VO4)2F)
Aragonite (aragonite: 1788) 5.AB.15    (IUPAC: calcium carbonate)
Arakiite (hematolite: IMA1998-062) 8.BE.45   
Aramayoite (aramayoite: 1926) 2.HA.25   
Arangasite (IMA2012-018) 8.DB.  [no]  (IUPAC: dialuminium fluoro sulfate phosphate nonahydrate)
Arapovite (steacyite: IMA2003-046) 9.CH.10   
Aravaipaite (aravaipaite: IMA1988-021) 3.DC.35    (IUPAC: trilead aluminium nonafluoride monohydrate)
Aravaite (arctite: IMA2018-078) 9.0   [no] [no]
Arcanite (arcanite: 1845) 7.AD.05    (IUPAC: dipotassium sulfate)
Archerite (biphosphammite: IMA1975-008) 8.AD.15    (IUPAC: potassium phosphoric acid)
Arctite (arctite: IMA1980-049) 8.BN.10    (IUPAC: (pentasodium calcium) hexacalcium barium trifluoro hexaphosphate)
Arcubisite (IMA1973-009) 2.LA.40    (IUPAC: hexasilver copper bismuth tetrasulfide)
Ardaite (madocite: IMA1979-073) 2.LB.30   
Ardealite (gypsum: 1932) 8.CJ.50    (IUPAC: dicalcium hydroxophosphate sulfate tetrahydrate)
Ardennite 9.BJ.40
Ardennite-(As) (IMA2007 s.p., 1872) 9.BJ.40   
Ardennite-(V) (IMA2005-037) 9.BJ.40   
Arfvedsonite [Na-amphibole: IMA2012 s.p., arfwedsonite (1823)] 9.DE.25   
Argandite (allactite: IMA2010-021) 8.BE.30  [no] [no] (IUPAC: heptamanganese octahydro divanadate)
Argentobaumhauerite (sartorite: IMA2015-F, IMA1988-051) 2.HC.05b   
Argentodufrénoysite (sartorite: IMA2016-046) 2.0  [no] [no]
Argentojarosite (alunite, alunite: IMA1987 s.p., 1923) 7.BC.10    (IUPAC: silver triiron(III) hexahydro disulfate)
Argentoliveingite (sartorite: IMA2016-029) 2.0  [no] [no]
Argentopentlandite (pentlandite: IMA1970-047) 2.BB.15   
Argentopearceite (pearceite-polybasite: IMA2020-049)  [no] [no]
Argentopolybasite-T2ac (IMA2021-119)
Argentopyrite (cubanite: 1866) 2.CB.65    (IUPAC: silver diiron trisulfide)
Argentotennantite-(Zn) (tetrahedrite: IMA2018-K, IMA1985-026) 2.GB.05    (Ag6(Cu4Zn2)As4S13)
Argentotetrahedrite (tetrahedrite) 2.GB.05
Argentotetrahedrite-(Cd) (IMA2022-053) 2.GB.05  [no] [no]
Argentotetrahedrite-(Fe) (IMA2018-K, IMA2016-093) 2.GB.05  [no] [no] (Ag6(Cu4Fe2)Sb4S12S)
Argentotetrahedrite-(Hg) (IMA2020-079) 2.GB.05  [no] [no] (Ag6(Cu4Hg2)Sb4S12S)
Argentotetrahedrite-(Zn) (IMA2020-069) 2.GB.05  [no] [no] (Ag6(Cu4Zn2)Sb4S12S)
Argesite (IMA2011-072) 3.0  [no] [no] (IUPAC: heptammonium tribismuth hexadecachloride)
Argutite (rutile: IMA1980-067) 4.DB.05    (IUPAC: germanium dioxide)
Argyrodite (argyrodite: 1886) 2.BA.70    (IUPAC: octasilver germanium hexasulfide)
Arhbarite (gilmarite: IMA1981-044) 8.BE.25    (IUPAC: dicopper magnesium trihydro arsenate)
Ariegilatite (nabimusaite, arctite: IMA2016-100) 9.A?.  [no] [no]
Arisite 5.BD.18
Arisite-(Ce) (IMA2009-013) 5.BD.18  [no] 
Arisite-(La) (IMA2009-019) 5.BD.18  [no] 
Aristarainite (IMA1973-029) 6.FB.05   
Armalcolite (pseudobrookite: IMA1970-006 Rd) 4.CB.15   
Armangite (Y: 1920) 4.JB.20   
Armbrusterite (IMA2005-035) 9.EG.65   [no]
Armellinoite-(Ce) (pottsite: IMA2018-094) 8.CG.  [no] [no]
Armenite (milarite: 1939) 9.CM.05   
Armstrongite (IMA1972-018) 9.EA.35   
Arrheniusite-(Ce) (IMA2019-086) 9.A?.  [no] [no]
Arrojadite 8.BF.05 
Arrojadite-(BaNa) (IMA2014-071) 8.BF.05  [no] [no]
Arrojadite-(KFe) (IMA2005 s.p., 1925) 8.BF.05   
Arrojadite-(KNa) (IMA2005-047) 8.BF.05   
Arrojadite-(PbFe) (IMA2005-056) 8.BF.05   [no]
Arrojadite-(SrFe) (IMA2005-032) 8.BF.05   [no]
Arsenatrotitanite (titanite: IMA2016-015) 8.0  [no] [no]
Arsenbrackebuschite (brackebuschite: IMA1977-014) 8.BG.05   
Arsendescloizite (adelite: IMA1979-030) 8.BH.35   
Arsenic (arsenic: old) 1.CA.05   
Arseniopleite (alluaudite: IMA1967 s.p., 1888) 8.AC.10    (NaCaMnMn2(AsO4)3)
Arseniosiderite (arseniosiderite: 1842) 8.DH.30   
Arsenmarcobaldiite (geocronite: IMA2016-045) 2.0  [no] [no]
Arsenmedaite (medaite: IMA2016-099) 9.BJ.  [no] [no] (IUPAC: hexamanganese(II) arsenopentasilicate octadecaoxy hydroxyl)
Arsenoclasite (arsenoclasite: 1931) 8.BD.10    (IUPAC: pentamanganese(II) tetrahydro diarsenate)
Arsenocrandallite (alunite, crandallite: IMA1980-060) 8.BL.10    (IUPAC: calcium trialuminium hexahydro arsenate hydroxoarsenate)
Arsenoflorencite 8.BL.13 (IUPAC: REE trialuminium hexahydro diarsenate)
Arsenoflorencite-(Ce) (alunite, crandallite: IMA1985-053) 8.BL.13   
Arsenoflorencite-(La) (alunite, crandallite: IMA2009-078) 8.BL.13   
Arsenoflorencite-(Nd)N (alunite, crandallite: 1991) 8.BL.13  [no] [no]
Arsenogorceixite (alunite, crandallite: IMA1989-055) 8.BL.10    (IUPAC: barium trialuminium hexahydro arsenate hydroxoarsenate)
Arsenogoyazite (alunite, crandallite: IMA1983-043) 8.BL.10    (IUPAC: strontium trialuminium hexahydro arsenate hydroxoarsenate)
Arsenohauchecornite (hauchecornite: IMA1978-E) 2.BB.10   
Arsenohopeite (hopeite: IMA2010-069) 8.CA.30  [no]  (IUPAC: trizinc diarsenate tetrahydrate)
Arsenolamprite (Y: 1886) 1.CA.10   
Arsenolite (arsenolite: 1854) 4.CB.50    (IUPAC: diarsenic trioxide)
Arsenopalladinite (stillwatterite: IMA1973-002a, 1955) 2.AC.10c    (IUPAC: octapalladium triarsenide)
Arsenopyrite (arsenopyrite: IMA1962 s.p., 1847) 2.EB.20    (IUPAC: iron arsenide sulfide)
Arsenotučekite (hauchecornite: IMA2019-135) 2.0  [no] [no]
Arsenovanmeersscheite (IMA2006-018) 8.EC.20   [no] (IUPAC: uranium triuranyl hexahydro diarsenate tetrahydrate)
Arsenoveszelyite (IMA2021-076a) 8.DE.  [no] [no]
Arsenowagnerite (wagnerite: IMA2014-100) 8.BB.  [no] [no] (IUPAC: dimagnesium fluoro arsenate)
Arsenquatrandorite (lillianite: IMA2012-087) 2.0  [no] [no]
Arsentsumebite (brackebuschite: 1935) 8.BG.05   
Arsenudinaite (IMA2018-067) 8.0  [no] [no] (IUPAC: sodium tetramagnesium triarsenate)
Arsenuranospathite (IMA1982 s.p.?, 1978) 8.EB.25    (IUPAC: aluminium diuranyl fluoro diarsenate icosahydrate)
Arsenuranylite (phosphuranylite: 1958) 8.EC.10    (IUPAC: calcium tetrauranyl tetrahydro diarsenate hexahydrate)
Arsiccioite (routhierite: IMA2013-058) 2.0  [no]  (IUPAC: silver dimercury thallium hexasulfa diarsenide)
Arsmirandite (arsmirandite: IMA2014-081) 8.0  [no] [no]
Arthurite (arthurite: IMA1964-002) 8.DC.15    (IUPAC: copper diiron(III) dihydro diarsenate tetrahydrate)
Artinite (artinite: 1902) 5.DA.10    (IUPAC: dimagnesium dihydro carbonate trihydrate)
Artroeite (IMA1993-031) 3.CC.15    (IUPAC: lead dihydro trifluoroaluminate)
Artsmithite (IMA2002-039) 8.BO.40   
Arupite (vivianite: IMA1988-008) 8.CE.40    (IUPAC: trinickel diphosphate octahydrate)
ArzakiteN (Y: 1985) 2.FC.15a   
ArzruniteQ (Y: 1899) 7.DF.60  [no] [no] Note: It might be a mixture.
Asbecasite (IMA1965-037) 4.JB.30    (Ca3TiAs6Be2Si2O20)
Asbolane (Y: 1841) 4.FL.30   
Aschamalmite (lillianite: IMA1982-089) 2.JB.40b   
Ashburtonite (cerchiaraite: IMA1990-033) 9.CF.05   
Ashcroftine-(Y) (IMA1967 s.p., 1933) 9.DN.15   
Ashoverite (hydroxide: IMA1986-008) 4.FA.10    (IUPAC: zinc dihydroxide)
Asimowite (wadsleyite: IMA2018-102) 9.B?.  [no] [no] (IUPAC: diiron tetraoxysilicate)
Asisite (asisite: IMA1987-003) 3.DB.40    (IUPAC: heptalead octaoxysilicate dichloride) 
Åskagenite-(Nd) (epidote: IMA2009-073) 9.BG.05b  [no] 
Aspedamite (menezesite: IMA2011-056) 4.0  [no] 
Aspidolite (mica: IMA2004-049 Rd) 9.EC.20   [no]
Asselbornite (IMA1980-087) 8.ED.10    (IUPAC: lead tetrauranyl heptahydro tri(bismuth oxide) diarsenate tetrahydrate)
Astrocyanite-(Ce) (IMA1989-032) 5.EF.05    (IUPAC: dicopper dicerium uranyl dihydro pentacarbonate (1.5)hydrate)
Astrophyllite (astrophyllite, astrophyllite: 1848) 9.DC.05   
Atacamite (Y: 1803) 3.DA.10a    (IUPAC: dicopper trihydro chloride)
Atelestite (atelestite: 1832) 8.BO.15   
Atelisite-(Y) (zircon: IMA2010-065) 9.0  [no] 
Atencioite (roscherite: IMA2004-041) 8.DA.10   [no]
Athabascaite (IMA1969-022) 2.BA.25    (IUPAC: pentacopper tetraselenide)
Atheneite (IMA1973-050) 2.AC.05a    (IUPAC: dipalladium arsenide)
Atlasovite (IMA1986-029) 7.BC.20   
Atokite (auricupride: IMA1974-041) 1.AG.10    (IUPAC: tripalladium stannide)
Attakolite (IMA1992 s.p., 1868) 8.BH.60   
Attikaite (IMA2006-017) 8.DJ.45    (IUPAC: tricalcium dicopper dialuminium tetrahydro tetrarsenate dihydrate)
Aubertite (aubertite: IMA1978-051) 7.DB.05    (IUPAC: copper(II) aluminium chloro disulfate tetradecahydrate)
Auerbakhite (IMA2020-047)  [no] [no]
Augelite (Y: 1868) 8.BE.05    (IUPAC: dialuminium trihydro phosphate)
AugiteI (pyroxene: IMA1988 s.p., 1792, 77CE) 9.DA.15   
Auriacusite (andalusite: IMA2009-037) 8.BB.30  [no]  (IUPAC: iron(III) copper(II) oxoarsenate)
Aurichalcite (Y: 1839) 5.BA.15    (IUPAC: pentazinc hexahydro dicarbonate)
Auricupride (auricupride: 1950) 1.AA.10a    (IUPAC: tricopper gold alloy)
Aurihydrargyrumite (amalgam: IMA2017-003) 1.AD.  [no] [no] (IUPAC: hexagold pentamercury amalgam)
Aurivilliusite (IMA2002-022) 3.DD.50    (IUPAC: 0.5(dimercury) mercury(II) oxoiodide)
Aurorite (IMA1966-031) 4.FL.20    (IUPAC: manganese(II) manganese(IV) heptaoxide trihydrate)
Auroselenide (IMA2022-052) 2.CB.  [no] [no]
Aurostibite (pyrite: 1952) 2.EB.05a    (IUPAC: gold diantimonide)
Austinite (Y: 1935) 8.BH.35    (IUPAC: calcium zinc hydro arsenate)
Autunite (autunite: 1852) 8.EB.05    (IUPAC: calcium diuranyl diphosphate (deca - dodeca)hydrate)
Avdeevite (beryl: IMA2018-109) 9.CJ.  [no] [no]
Avdoninite (IMA2005-046a) 3.DA.55    (IUPAC: dipotassium pentacopper tetrahydro octachloride dihydrate)
Averievite (IMA1995-027) 8.BB.85    (IUPAC: pentacopper dioxo diarsenate · copper dichloride)
Avicennite (bixbyite: 1958) 4.CB.10    (IUPAC: dithallium trioxide)
Avogadrite (fluoroborate: 1926) 3.CA.10    (IUPAC: potassium tetrafluoroborate)
Awaruite (auricupride: 1885) 1.AE.20    (IUPAC: trinickel iron alloy)
Axelite (IMA2017-015a) 8.BA.  [no] [no] (Na14Cu7(AsO4)8F2Cl2)
Axinite 9.BD.20
Axinite-(Fe) (IMA1968 s.p., 1911, 1801) 9.BD.20   
Axinite-(Mg) (IMA1975-025, 1975) 9.BD.20   
Axinite-(Mn) (Y: 1909) 9.BD.20   
Azoproite (ludwigite: IMA1970-021) 6.AB.30   
Azurite (Y: 1832) 5.BA.05    (IUPAC: tricopper dihydro dicarbonate)

External links
IMA Database of Mineral Properties/ RRUFF Project
Mindat.org - The Mineral Database
Webmineral.com
Mineralatlas.eu minerals A